Booker T or Booker T. may refer to

 Booker T. Washington (1856–1915), African American political leader at the turn of the 20th century
 List of things named after Booker T. Washington, some nicknamed "Booker T."
 Booker T. Jones (born 1944), American musician and frontman of Booker T. and the M.G.'s
 Booker T (wrestler) (born 1965), ring name of American professional wrestler Booker Huffman 

Also
 Booker T. Bradshaw (1940–2003), American record producer, film and TV actor, and  executive
 Booker T. Laury (1914–1995), American boogie-woogie and blues pianist
 Booker T. Spicely (1909–1944) victim of a racist murder in North Carolina, United States
 Booker T. Whatley (1915–2005) agricultural professor at Tuskegee University
 Booker T. Washington White (1909–1977), American Delta blues guitarist and singer known as Bukka White
 Booker T. Boffin, pseudonym of Thomas Dolby on Def Leppard's album Pyromania 
 "Booker T" (song), by Bad Bunny (2020)

See also
 

it:Booker T